Kong: Skull Island (Original Motion Picture Soundtrack) is the soundtrack to the 2017 American monster film Kong: Skull Island. A reboot of the King Kong franchise and while also serving as its 11th film, it is the second film in Legendary's MonsterVerse. The musical score composed by Henry Jackman, featured 24 tracks which was digitally released on March 3, 2017, through WaterTower Music. It was bundled into a double LP format published by Waxwork Records and was released on January 19, 2018. In 2022, Reservoir Media acquired the rights to the catalog of Jackman's film scores, with Kong: Skull Island also being included in this catalog.

Development 
Since the film takes place in the 1970s, Jackman blended '70s psychedelic guitars into the score, which was considered to be a combination of mixing electronic sounds with symphony orchestra. Jackman stated that "The great thing about a monster movie is that it opens the door to use the symphony orchestra in its most sumptuous way. [Director] Jordan [Vogt-Roberts] was happy to celebrate the gravity and history that comes with a full orchestra, but we also explored less traditional elements. That's a field day for a composer." The score was recorded at AIR Lyndhurst Studios with the London Voices and conducted by Gavin Greenaway, with additional music by Alex Belcher, Halli Cauthery, and Stephen Hilton.

Regarding the music used in the film, Vogt-Roberts stated, "I wanted to use songs from the Vietnam era and a myriad of hits from the '70s... [T]his provides a striking dichotomy, sets the tone and gives us great moments of fun. The music, which serves to both heighten the film's emotion and underscore the action, was one of the final creative elements to fall into place during post-production. It was the culmination of a massive undertaking that had taken the production to three continents."

For the sequel Godzilla vs. Kong (2021), the original cues composed for Kong: Skull Island were disregarded and Tom Holkenborg composed fresh themes for Kong's character in the film.

Track listing 

 Music appearing in the film and not included in the soundtrack

References

External links 

 

2017 soundtrack albums
Film scores
Henry Jackman soundtracks
WaterTower Music soundtracks
MonsterVerse soundtracks
King Kong (franchise)